South New Castle is a borough in Lawrence County, Pennsylvania, United States. The population was 649 at the 2020 census. It is primarily a residential community which lies south of the city of New Castle, and is part of the New Castle micropolitan area.

Geography
South New Castle is located at  (40.975430, -80.344624).

According to the United States Census Bureau, the borough has a total area of 0.3 square mile (0.9 km²), all  land.

Demographics

As of the census of 2000, there were 808 people, 309 households, and 232 families residing in the borough. The population density was 2,380.0 people per square mile (917.6/km²). There were 326 housing units at an average density of 960.2 per square mile (370.2/km²). The racial makeup of the borough was 99.38% White, 0.37% Native American, 0.12% Asian, and 0.12% from two or more races.

There were 309 households, out of which 31.1% had children under the age of 18 living with them, 61.2% were married couples living together, 10.4% had a female householder with no husband present, and 24.6% were non-families. 22.0% of all households were made up of individuals, and 15.5% had someone living alone who was 65 years of age or older. The average household size was 2.61 and the average family size was 3.04.

In the borough the population was spread out, with 22.9% under the age of 18, 9.7% from 18 to 24, 24.1% from 25 to 44, 24.8% from 45 to 64, and 18.6% who were 65 years of age or older. The median age was 41 years. For every 100 females there were 94.2 males. For every 100 females age 18 and over, there were 89.9 males.

The median income for a household in the borough was $30,568, and the median income for a family was $38,472. Males had a median income of $29,926 versus $20,781 for females. The per capita income for the borough was $15,095. About 5.8% of families and 8.2% of the population were below the poverty line, including 9.8% of those under age 18 and 4.8% of those age 65 or over.

References

Populated places established in 1901
Boroughs in Lawrence County, Pennsylvania